The 14th Emmy Awards, later referred to as the 14th Primetime Emmy Awards, were held on May 22, 1962, to honor the best in television of the year. It was hosted by Johnny Carson in New York, Bob Newhart in Los Angeles and David Brinkley in Washington, DC. All nominations are listed, with winners in bold and series' networks are in parentheses.

The top show of the night was the CBS courtroom drama The Defenders which swept the four major categories it was nominated in. The Bob Newhart Show won top honors for comedy, and in doing so, became the first show to win a top program prize (comedy or drama) for what would be the show's only season. Composer Richard Rodgers would also become the first person to complete the Grand Slam of entertainment awards (Emmy, Grammy, Oscar, and Tony) when winning for Outstanding Achievement in Original Music Composed with Winston Churchill: The Valiant Years.

Among the better-known presenters were Fred Astaire, Lucille Ball, Barbara Stanwyck, Judy Garland, Jimmy Durante, Jack Webb, Walter Brennan, Eartha Kitt, Supreme Court Justice William O. Douglas and Cyril Ritchard, whose pronunciation of "tomatoes" as "tomahtoes" greatly amused the audience; he humorously apologized and repeated it with the American pronunciation.

Winners and nominees

Programs

Acting

Lead performances

Supporting performances

Single performances

Directing

Writing

Most major nominations
By network 
 NBC – 37
 CBS – 35
 ABC – 26

 By program
 Ben Casey (ABC) / Hallmark Hall of Fame (NBC) – 7
 The Dick Powell Theatre (NBC) – 6
 Alcoa Premiere (ABC) / The Defenders (CBS) / Naked City (ABC) – 4
 ABC Close Up! (ABC) / Car 54, Where Are You? (NBC) / CBS Reports (CBS) / The Red Skelton Show (CBS) – 3

Most major awards
By network 
 NBC – 10
 CBS – 9

 By program
 The Defenders (CBS) – 4
 Hallmark Hall of Fame (NBC) – 3

Notes

References

External links
 Emmys.com list of 1962 Nominees & Winners
 

014
Emmy Awards
Emmy Awards
Primetime Emmy
Primetime Emmy Awards